8th Street Nites is the second studio album by Back Door, released in 1973 by Warner Bros. Records. It was recorded at Electric Lady Studios in New York and produced by Felix Pappalardi, famous for his production of Cream and playing in the American rock band, Mountain.

In 2014 it was re-released on CD, compiled with Back Door and Another Fine Mess, by BGO Records.

Track listing

Personnel
Adapted from the 8th Street Nites liner notes.

Back Door
 Ron Aspery – alto saxophone, soprano saxophone, flute, electric piano
 Tony Hicks – drums
 Colin Hodgkinson – bass guitar, vocals

Production and additional personnel
 Bob D'Orleans – engineering
 Tom Hummer – assistant engineer
 Robert McFarlane – photography
 Felix Pappalardi – production, tambourine (A1), electric piano (A2), percussion (B4)

Release history

References

External links 
 

1973 albums
Back Door (jazz trio) albums
Warner Records albums
Albums produced by Felix Pappalardi